Kelson is a suburb of Lower Hutt in Wellington, New Zealand. It is situated on the western hills of the Hutt Valley. To the west of the suburb lies the Belmont Regional Park, while to the east runs the Hutt River and State Highway 2.

History

Kelson takes its name from George Kells, the original settler owner of the land, and from his son Bill who directed the subdivision, hence the name "Kelson". It was advertised in 1961 as "the gateway to a new suburb".

During the 1960s, the lower parts of Kelson were built on. Residential development did not commence on any large scale until about 1973–1974, when approval was given for its boundaries to be extended into the western hills.

The population trebled between 1971 and 1976, making it the fastest-growing suburb in Lower Hutt during that period.

Geography

Kelson forms part of the western hills of the Hutt Valley, with the Hutt River to the east.

The suburb is adjacent to Speedys Reserve/Pareraho Forest, and the wider Belmont Regional Park. Picnic areas, walking and biking tracks in this region are looked after by volunteers from the Pareraho Forest Trust.  Pareraho Forest contains lowland forest on hill country, with diverse canopy species including large specimens of Laurelia novae-zelandiae (Pukatea), Tawa, Knightia excelsa (Rewarewa) and Kohekohe. The region is also home to a variety of native bird species, including tūī, pīwakawaka, grey warbler, whitehead, ruru, silvereye and kererū.

Landmarks

Kelson Playground is situated on Taieri Crescent behind Kelson Kindergarten and next to Kelson School. It was opened in May 1976 by John Kennedy-Good, the mayor of Lower Hutt at the time. The original playground was designed and constructed by the Western Hills Lions Club in association with the Belmont Women's Organisation. In February 2021 the playground received an upgrade thanks to a council community partnership between the Kelson School Fundraising Committee and Hutt City Council. It was renamed Pareraho Playground. 

Kelson Community Centre is situated on Timaru Grove and run by the Kelson Community Association. After a local family gifted the section to the community, it was built and opened in March 1986 with community-raised funds and council assistance. The centre hosts public meetings, fairs, quiz and bingo evenings, children's birthday parties, fundraisers, corporate functions, engagement parties, church groups, theatre groups, and a regular playgroup.

Discovery Elim Christian Centre is an Elim Pentecostal Church located on Major Drive. It originated as Kelson Christian Centre, with the first service held at the Kelson Community Centre in November 1996. As the congregation expanded, it moved services to Kelson School. Subsequently, the purpose-built facility currently in use was built and commenced use on 11 February 2007. The name was changed to Discovery Christian Centre, and an adjoining Early Learning Centre was opened in April 2007. A few years later, the church joined the Elim movement, and held their inaugural service as Discovery Elim Christian Centre on 1 May 2011.

Demographics

Kelson had a population of 2,835 at the 2018 New Zealand census, an increase of 138 people (5.1%) since the 2013 census, and an increase of 216 people (8.2%) since the 2006 census. There were 1,002 households. There were 1,395 males and 1,440 females, giving a sex ratio of 0.97 males per female. The median age was 36.2 years (compared with 37.4 years nationally), with 606 people (21.4%) aged under 15 years, 507 (17.9%) aged 15 to 29, 1,455 (51.3%) aged 30 to 64, and 261 (9.2%) aged 65 or older.

Ethnicities were 75.3% European/Pākehā, 9.5% Māori, 5.0% Pacific peoples, 16.8% Asian, and 4.3% other ethnicities (totals add to more than 100% since people could identify with multiple ethnicities).

The proportion of people born overseas was 27.3%, compared with 27.1% nationally.

Although some people objected to giving their religion, 45.0% had no religion, 39.0% were Christian, 5.1% were Hindu, 0.7% were Muslim, 1.4% were Buddhist and 2.8% had other religions.

Of those at least 15 years old, 708 (31.8%) people had a bachelor or higher degree, and 219 (9.8%) people had no formal qualifications. The median income was $46,800, compared with $31,800 nationally. The employment status of those at least 15 was that 1,380 (61.9%) people were employed full-time, 333 (14.9%) were part-time, and 57 (2.6%) were unemployed.

Education

Kelson Kindergarten, situated on Taieri Crescent, provides education and care for children from two to five years of age. The kindergarten is licensed for up to 45 children. It originates from a Kelson committee formed in 1973 to establish a kindergarten in the area. Work commenced immediately, and the name of Taieri Crescent was decided. Tenders were called prior to December 1974, and it was in use by 1975. The kindergarten was extended in 1982 to include a wet-weather activities area, paid for exclusively by fundraising.

Also situated on Taieri Crescent is Kelson School, a co-educational contributing primary school. It was opened on 22 May 1978 with a roll of 113. In 2017 it had a roll of 209 and a decile rating of 10.

Public services
A popular community recycling station at the bottom of Kelson Hill was closed in 2021 when Hutt City Council distributed recycling & waste bins for every household.

References

Suburbs of Lower Hutt
Populated places on Te Awa Kairangi / Hutt River